Lappajärvi is a municipality in Finland in Southern Ostrobothnia region. The population density is
.

The municipality is unilingually Finnish.

Lake Lappajärvi, which gives the name to the municipality, is a meteor crater, one of the few meteor crater lakes found in Finland.

Singer and performer, Timo Kotipelto from the worldwide known Finnish power metal band Stratovarius was born and raised in Lappajärvi.

Notable people born in Lappajärvi
Johannes Bäck (1872 – 1952)
Aleksi Hakala (1886 – 1959)
Veikko Savela (1919 – 2015)
Jarmo Övermark (1955 – )
Arto Melleri (1956 – 2005)
Seppo Särkiniemi (1957 – )
Jussi Lampi (1961 – )
Timo Kotipelto (1969 – )
Petra Olli (1994 – )

See also
 Lappajärvi Church

References

External links

Municipality of Lappajärvi – Official website

Municipalities of South Ostrobothnia
Populated places established in 1865